Václav Kindl (born 1882, date of death unknown) was a Czechoslovak sports shooter. He competed in six events at the 1920 Summer Olympics.

References

External links
 

1882 births
Year of death missing
Czechoslovak male sport shooters
Olympic shooters of Czechoslovakia
Shooters at the 1920 Summer Olympics
Sportspeople from Prague